

Flora
Fraxinus americana, a species of tree native to eastern and central North America
Fraxinus albicans, a species of tree native to eastern Texas and southern Oklahoma
Eucalyptus fraxinoides, a species of Australian tree

Towns
White Ash, Kentucky, a town in the USA

Other
White Ash (band), a Japanese music band